Southern Ijaw is a Local Government Area of Bayelsa State, Southern part of Nigeria. The area has a coastline of approximately 60 km on the Bight of Benin.

The people and their language are known as Izon. The LGA also has a wide practice of religion such as Traditionalism and Christianity.

It has institutions like the Niger Delta University (NDU), the state's airport in Amassoma and Federal Polytechnic, Ekowe. It is the home of Kolu United FC of Koluama II.

The first democratically elected governor, Chief Diepreye Alamieyeseigha (DSP) hailed from the area.

It has an area of 2,682 km and a population of 319,413 at the 2006 census.

The postal code of the area is 560. The local government is made up of several towns and villages which include Igbomotoro, Peremabiri, Opuama, Eniwari, Angiama, Diebu, Ondewari, and Aziama.

Climate 
In the Southern Ijaw, the wet season is mostly warm and overcast, the dry season is hot and mostly cloudy, and it is oppressive year round. Over the course of the year, the temperature typically varies from 72 °F to 86 °F and is rarely below 65 °F or above 89 °F.

References

Local Government Areas in Bayelsa State
Populated coastal places in Nigeria